"The Sailor Song" (accompanied with the slogan "Guaranteed To Make You Feel Good!") is a song by Danish pop duo Toy-Box. It is the third single off their debut album Fantastic. Even though "The Sailor Song" did not succeed as well as their earlier singles "Tarzan & Jane" and "Best Friend," it was still a widely popular and fan favorite song.

Track listing 

 The Sailor Song – 3:12
 The Sailor Song (Extended Version) – 4:08
 The Sailor Song (Bulletproof Remix) – 6:34
 The Sailor Song (Elephant and Castle Remix) – 5:31

Other remixes and versions 

Three other non-album versions of "The Sailor Song" have been confirmed by Toy-Box's official website.

 The Sailor Song (Radio edit) – 3:05
 The Sailor Song (Video edit) – 3:24
 The Sailor Song (Steelo Reggaeton Remix) – 3:05

Charts

Weekly charts

Year-end charts

References 

Songs about sailors
Songs about oceans and seas
1998 songs
1999 singles
Toy-Box songs
Electronic songs
Edel AG singles
Mega Records singles
Victor Entertainment singles